Beris Dam is a water supply dam located in Sik District, Kedah, Malaysia. The dam is a concrete-faced rockfill dam located in a narrow valley along Beris River, 1.6 km upstream from the river's confluence with Muda River.

The dam was completed in 2004 at a cost of RM360 million and is used to regulate the flow of water along the Muda River basin to augment water available for irrigation of paddy or upland crops, for domestic and industrial water supply and other uses. The reservoir at its normal pool level covers an area of 13.7 km square whilst at maximum pool level inundates an area of 16.1 km square. It has a gross storage capacity of 122.4 million cubic metres with an effective storage of 144 million cubic metres.

See also
 Water supply and sanitation in Malaysia

References

2004 establishments in Malaysia
Buildings and structures in Kedah
Dams completed in 2004
Dams in Malaysia
Sik District